The 1988 Seattle Seahawks season was the team's 13th season with the National Football League (NFL). The Seahawks won their first division title in the AFC West. They won the division with only a 9–7 record and finished with only a +10-point differential.

The team never went under .500 during the season and clinched the AFC West in Week 16 with a 43–37 shootout win over the Los Angeles Raiders. The Seahawks were the #3 seed in the AFC playoffs; they lost 21–13 on the road in the Divisional round to the top-seeded Cincinnati Bengals on December 31.

In late August, Ken Behring and partner Ken Hofmann purchased the team from the Nordstrom family for $80 million.

1988 NFL Draft

Personnel

Staff

Final roster
{{NFL final roster
|Year=1988
|TeamName=Seattle Seahawks
|BC1=#00338D
|FC1=white
|BDC1=#008542
|offseason=no
|ufa=no
|rfa=no
|erfa=no
|Active=48
|Inactive=7
|PS=0

|Quarterbacks=

 *

|Running Backs=

 KR/PR
 FB|Wide Receivers=

|Tight Ends=

|Offensive Linemen=
 G C
 C
 C
 G
 T G
 G/T
 T|Defensive Linemen=
 DE
 NT
 DE DE
 NT

|Linebackers=

 *

|Defensive Backs=

 CB
 CB
 SS FS
 CB|Special Teams=
 K
 P

|Reserve Lists=

|Practice Squad=

}}

     Starters in bold.
 (*) Denotes players that were selected for the 1989 Pro Bowl.

Schedule

Preseason

Source: Seahawks Media Guides1989 Seahawks Media Guide, accessed February 14, 2015.

Regular season
Divisional matchups have the AFC West playing the NFC West.Bold''' indicates division opponents.
Source: 1988 NFL season results

Postseason

Standings

Game Summaries

Preseason

Week P1: vs. Phoenix Cardinals

Week P2: at Detroit Lions

Week P3: vs. Buffalo Bills

Week P4: at San Francisco 49ers

Regular season

Week 1: at Denver Broncos

Week 2: vs. Kansas City Chiefs

Week 3: at San Diego Chargers

Week 4: vs. San Francisco 49ers

Week 5: at Atlanta Falcons

Week 6: at Cleveland Browns

Week 7: vs. New Orleans Saints

Week 8: at Los Angeles Rams

Week 9: vs. San Diego Chargers

Week 10: vs. Buffalo Bills

Week 11: vs. Houston Oilers

Week 12: at Kansas City Chiefs

Week 13: vs. Los Angeles Raiders

Week 14: at New England Patriots

Week 15: vs. Denver Broncos

Week 16: at Los Angeles Raiders

Postseason

Seattle entered the postseason as the #3 seed in the AFC.

AFC Divisional Playoff: at #1 Cincinnati Bengals

References

External links
 Seahawks draft history at NFL.com
 1988 NFL season results at NFL.com

Seattle
Seattle Seahawks seasons
AFC West championship seasons